Jacek Andrzej Bazański (born 11 August 1958, Warsaw) is a Polish diplomat. He is currently serving as the Polish ambassador to Kenya.

Early life 
Jacek Bazański graduated with a degree in Romance studies from the University of Warsaw in 1982. Two years later he became a certified French language translator. Bazański was also educated at the National School of Public Administration.

Diplomatic career
In the 1980s, Bazański joined the Ministry of Foreign Affairs and worked both domestically and abroad. He has been a member of the diplomatic missions to Kinshasa and Rome. Bazański also served as deputy ambassador to Paris and the Hague.

From 13 January 2010 to 30 January 2015, Bazański served as Polish ambassador to Argentina. Later, he was the director of the Inspectorate of the Foreign Service. In March 2018, Bazański became Ambassador to Kenya, accredited also to Madagascar, Mauritius, Seychelles, Somalia and Uganda. He presented his letter of credence to president Uhuru Kenyatta on 4 May 2018.

Besides Polish and French, Bazański speaks English, Spanish and Italian languages.

Personal life
He is married to Anna Bazańska. She serves as Polish consul in Nairobi. Together they have three children.

References 

1958 births
21st-century Polish novelists
Ambassadors of Poland to Argentina
Ambassadors of Poland to Kenya
Living people
National School of Public Administration (Poland) alumni
Diplomats from Warsaw
University of Warsaw alumni